Arthur Claude Ruge (pronounced ; July 28, 1905 – April 3, 2000) was an American mechanical engineer and inventor who developed and pioneered the modern bonded wire resistance strain gauge.

Background
Ruge graduated from Carnegie Mellon University with a mechanical engineering degree in 1925, and worked as a structural engineer for several years thereafter. He then earned his master's degree in civil engineering and a doctorate in engineering seismology from MIT. In 1932, Ruge joined the faculty of MIT1, where he would spend the rest of his academic career, becoming America's first professor of engineering seismology2.

Seismology
The 1933 Long Beach earthquake gave Ruge a new direction 3. The disaster had proved the importance of earthquake engineering. Buildings that had been appropriately engineered and reinforced sustained little to no structural damage, while the rest of Long Beach suffered catastrophic ruin. Ruge turned the focus of his research to the development of earthquake-resistant architecture, specifically a method to provide seismic insulation for water towers. In his lab at MIT, Ruge and his research assistant constructed a hydraulic shake table that simulated the effects of the Long Beach earthquake; on this table they placed a replica of a water tower 4. It was this research, and the need to measure stress caused by earthquakes that eventually led to Ruge's invention of the strain gauge.

Invention of the Strain Gauge
During the course of his seismic insulation research, Ruge discovered that he needed to measure the stress on the water tanks that was caused by the earthquakes, and so he set about devising a means for attaining this measurement. According to Ruge, he had a Eureka moment on April 3, 1938, when “the invention just popped into my mind, whole. I could see it clearly and knew that it would work.” His solution was to glue a piece of cigarette paper on the tank and glue a small wire with end connections to the paper 4. Ruge and his assistants quickly developed this rudimentary device  into the more advanced version that would later be patented.

Barnaby Feder writes:
The SR-4 was a deceptively simple invention composed of four thin tungsten filaments, similar to those used in light bulbs, glued together in the shape of a diamond. When an electrical current is run across the wires, no voltage can be measured as long as they remain perfectly aligned. But if some force disturbs the symmetry, and thus the resistance in the wires, the gauge puts out a voltage proportional to the force.

When MIT released the right to Ruge's invention, saying that, while “interesting,” the strain gauge didn't show much potential, he immediately went about commercializing it. Only then did he discover that his strain gauge had already been invented the year before by Edward E. Simmons, an electrical engineer at Caltech. Though the Simmons was the first to invent the resistance wire strain gauge, both men are credited with the discovery and share the original patent. The trade name of the device, SR-4, which stands for “Simmons Ruge – 4 people,” acknowledges both men and indicates that four people (Simmons, Ruge and their respective assistants) were responsible for its realization5.

Founding of a Company
In 1939, Arthur Ruge and Alfred de Forest, a colleague from MIT and fellow inventor, founded a company, Ruge Consulting, that pioneered and manufactured the SR-4 and continued to innovate new, related technologies. They produced the first commercial shipment of strain gages – a 50,000-piece order in 1941  6. In 1955, Baldwin-Lima-Hamilton bought the Ruge Consulting and rights to the SR-4 strain gage and renamed the company BLH Electronics Inc. A new company, RdF Corporation was formed to continue development and manufacturing of temperature sensors. The name RdF is short for Ruge and de Forest.

Awards, Distinctions, Legacy
 1938 to 1939 - Served as Vice-Chairman of Seismological Society of America (Eastern Section)
 1939 to 1940 - Served as Chairman of Seismological Society of America (Eastern Section) 
 1955 – Delivered Murray Lecture at the annual SEM Meeting
 1959 – Alumni Achievement Award from Carnegie Mellon University
 1986 – Inventor of the Year Award from Boston Museum of Science
 Arthur C. Ruge Charitable Fund

References

1905 births
2000 deaths
People from Tomah, Wisconsin
People from Lexington, Massachusetts
Carnegie Mellon University College of Engineering alumni
MIT School of Engineering alumni
20th-century American inventors
American mechanical engineers